Sioma is a constituency of the National Assembly of Zambia. It was created in 2016, when Sinjembela was split into two constituencies (Sioma and Shang'ombo). It covers Sioma District in Western Province.

List of MPs

References 

Constituencies of the National Assembly of Zambia
2016 establishments in Zambia
Constituencies established in 2016